I'm Nobody's Sweetheart Now is a 1940 American romantic comedy directed by Arthur Lubin and starring Dennis O'Keefe, Constance Moore and Helen Parrish. It was produced and distributed by Universal Pictures.

Plot
Football player Tod Lowell is the son of a man running for governor, who needs the support of a political boss. Tod's dad asks a favor, that Tod spend a few weeks squiring Gertrude Morgan, the man's daughter.

Trouble is, Tod's been romantically involved with Betty Gilbert, a nightclub singer, while Gert's gotten engaged to Tod's football rival, Andy Mason. A few tricks are played on the parents to make them believe Tod and Gertrude are serious, but just as they are about to return to their former partners, the two realize they actually have fallen for one another.

Cast
 Constance Moore as Betty Gilbert
 Dennis O'Keefe as Tod Lowell
 Helen Parrish as Gertrude
 Lewis Howard as Andy
 Laura Hope Crews	Mrs. Lowell
 Berton Churchill as Sen. Lowell
 Samuel S. Hinds as Morgan
 Margaret Hamilton as 	Mrs. Thriffie
 Marjorie Gateson as 	Mrs. Morgan
 Walter Soderling as Abner Thriffle
 Walter Baldwin as 	Elmer
 Tim Ryan sa 	Judge Saunders
 Hattie Noel as Bedelia
 Steve Pendleton as 	Chuck 
 Gene O'Donnell as Eddie
 James Craig as 	Ray
 Rex Evans as 	Parkins the Butler
 Alphonse Martell as 	Headwaiter

Production
The film was originally called The Bride Said No. Arthur Lubin was assigned to direct in May 1940. Filming started later that month. Hal Block signed to write some last minute comedy dialogue.

Reception
Diabolique magazine called it "a cheerful comedy... so briskly done and well acted that it doesn’t hit you until the movie’s almost over how selfish the lead couple are – Lubin’s empathy for all his characters possibly threw this off balance because all the audience sympathy goes to the partners of O’Keefe and Parrish."

References

External links
I'm Nobody's Sweetheart Now at IMDb
I'm Nobody's Sweetheart Now at TCMDB
I'm Nobody's Sweetheart Now at BFI
I'm Nobody's Sweetheart Now at Letterbox DVD
Review of film at Variety

1940 films
1940 romantic comedy films
American romantic comedy films
Films directed by Arthur Lubin
American black-and-white films
1940s English-language films
1940s American films
Universal Pictures films